Naifoua Vise Timai is a Samoan archer who has represented Samoa at the Pacific Games.

Timai is from Gataivai on the island of Savaiʻi.

At the 2019 Pacific Games in Apia she won a bronze medal in the women's compound, compound matchplay, and (alongside Mathew Tauiliili) the mixed team compound.

References

Living people
People from Palauli
Samoan female archers
Year of birth missing (living people)